Kowhan (also Romanized as Kowhān and Kūhān; also known as Golshanābād, Gūhān, and Kahān) is a village in Rezvaniyeh Rural District, in the Central District of Tiran and Karvan County, Isfahan Province, Iran. At the 2006 census, its population was 248, in 77 families.

References 

Populated places in Tiran and Karvan County